The Cal 28 is an American sailboat, that was designed by C. William Lapworth and first built in 1963. It was originally marketed as the California 28.

Production
The boat was built by Cal Yachts in the United States between 1963 and 1969, but it is now out of production.

The design was also built under licence by Calgan Marine in North Vancouver, Canada.

A total of 347 examples of the type were completed.

Design
The Cal 28 is a small recreational keelboat, built predominantly of fiberglass. It has a masthead sloop rig, an internally-mounted spade-type rudder and a fixed fin keel. It displaces  and carries  of lead ballast.

A Universal Atomic 4 gasoline engine with a "V" drive was a factory option.

The boat has a PHRF racing average handicap of 183 with a high of 186 and low of 180.

See also
List of sailing boat types

Similar sailboats
Alerion Express 28
Aloha 28
Beneteau First 285
Beneteau Oceanis 281
Bristol Channel Cutter
Catalina 28
Cumulus 28
Grampian 28
Hunter 28
Hunter 28.5
Hunter 280
J/28
Laser 28
O'Day 28
Pearson 28
Sabre 28
Sea Sprite 27
Sirius 28
Tanzer 8.5
Tanzer 28
TES 28 Magnam
Viking 28

References

Keelboats
1960s sailboat type designs
Sailing yachts
Sailboat type designs by Bill Lapworth
Sailboat types built by Cal Yachts
Sailboat types built by Calgan Marine